Daphnella cubana is a species of sea snail, a marine gastropod mollusk in the family Raphitomidae.

Description
The length of the shell attains 15 mm.

Distribution
D. cubana can be found in Atlantic waters, ranging from the Campeche Bank to Cuba.

References

 Espinosa J. & Fernández-Garcés R. (1990). El género Daphnella (Mollusca: Neogastropoda) en Cuba. Descripción de nuevas especies. Poeyana. 396: 1-16

External links
  Rosenberg, G.; Moretzsohn, F.; García, E. F. (2009). Gastropoda (Mollusca) of the Gulf of Mexico, Pp. 579–699 in: Felder, D.L. and D.K. Camp (eds.), Gulf of Mexico–Origins, Waters, and Biota. Texas A&M Press, College Station, Texas
 

cubana
Gastropods described in 1990